Sara (minor planet designation: 533 Sara) is a minor planet orbiting the Sun.

References

External links
 
 

Background asteroids
Sara
Sara
S-type asteroids (Tholen)
S-type asteroids (SMASS)
19040419